A Woman's Man is a 1934 American pre-Code comedy film directed by Edward Ludwig and starring John Halliday, Marguerite De La Motte and Wallace Ford. The screenplay concerns a film star diva who storms off the film set and begins a romance with a publicity-hungry boxer.

Cast
 John Halliday as Tom Cleary - Director  
 Marguerite De La Motte as Gloria Jordan - Star  
 Wallace Ford as Joe Flynn - Prizefighter  
 Kitty Kelly as Molly Evans - Secretary  
 Jameson Thomas as Roger Pentley - Playboy  
 Tom Dugan as Pete Miller - Trainer  
 Wallis Clark as Ralph Mallon- Studio Chief  
 Donald Douglas as Walter Payson - Horseback Rider  
 Leigh Allen as Crane - Leading Man  
 George Mayo as Assistant Director  
 Harrison Greene as Fight Announcer  
 Jack Perry as Joe Ferrera  
 Billie Van Every as Blonde

References

Bibliography
 Langman, Larry. Destination Hollywood: The Influence of Europeans on American Filmmaking. McFarland, 2000.

External links
 

1934 films
1934 comedy films
1930s English-language films
American comedy films
Films directed by Edward Ludwig
Monogram Pictures films
Films about filmmaking
American black-and-white films
1930s American films